Neurigona quadrifasciata is a species of long-legged fly in the family Dolichopodidae.

References

Neurigoninae
Insects described in 1781
Taxa named by Johan Christian Fabricius